Rippavilla Plantation, also known as Meadowbrook and Nathaniel Cheairs House, is a former plantation, historic house and museum, located in Spring Hill, Tennessee. This plantation had been worked by enslaved Black people for many years. It is open to visitors as a historic house museum.

It is listed on the National Register of Historic Places on July 19, 1996, for its architectural significance.

History
The Cheairs family were part of a 1810 land grant awarded by President James Madison. Initially the property included a 1500-acre farm. Nathaniel Frances Cheairs IV (1818–1914) resided on the property along with his wife, Susan Peters Cheairs (née McKissack; 1821–1893) until her death. Around 1860, the Cheairs family owned at least 40 enslaved Black people. Nathaniel Frances Cheairs IV served in the Confederate Army, however the Rippavilla Plantation sustained minimal damage during the American Civil War.

The plantation house was built in several phases but was extensively remodeled between 1928 and 1932. Its architectural style was antebellum Greek Revival, however modifications to the house were done in a 20th-century Colonial Revival style. It is believed that many of the upgrades to the house were done by slaves with knowledge of skilled crafts such as carpentry.

His son, William McKissack Cheairs took ownership of the home until he sold it in 1920 to John G. Whitfield, a coal tycoon from Alabama.

References

External links
 - official site

Antebellum architecture
Colonial Revival architecture in Tennessee
Greek Revival houses in Tennessee
Houses on the National Register of Historic Places in Tennessee
Historic house museums in Tennessee
Museums in Maury County, Tennessee
Plantation houses in Tennessee
Houses completed in 1852
Houses in Maury County, Tennessee
National Register of Historic Places in Maury County, Tennessee
1852 establishments in Tennessee